August Stradal (17 May 1860, Teplice – 13 March 1930, Krásná Lípa) was a Czech virtuoso pianist, arranger, composer, author and music teacher.

Career
A diverse piano arranger, Stradal arranged music from Bach, Beethoven, Brahms, Bruckner, Buxtehude, Liszt, Mozart, Paganini, Purcell, Reubke, Strauss, Wagner and Vivaldi.

A student of Anton Bruckner, he made solo piano arrangements of that composer's symphonies 1, 2, 5, 6, and 8. His pianistic credentials included studies with both Theodor Leschetizky and Franz Liszt, with whom he studied from late 1884, appearing in the latter's master classes in Weimar, Rome, and Pest, where he played some of Liszt's most difficult works. He arranged Liszt's 13 Symphonic Poems. He received the Czechoslovak State Award in 1928.

Selected works (solo piano) 
 Bach - Organ sonata in E minor
 Bach - Second Organ Concerto
 Bach - Brandenburg Concertos nos.3 and 4
 Bach - Piano Concerto in F major
 Bach W.F. - Fantasy and Fugue in A minor
 Beethoven - String Quartet, Op.131
 Brahms - 3 Caprices after the Waltzes, Op.39 
 Bruckner - String Quintet in F major 
 Buxtehude - Passacaglia in D minor
 Buxtehude - Prelude and fugue in A minor
 Buxtehude - Prelude and fugue in D minor
 Buxtehude - Prelude and fugue in E minor (no.2)
 Buxtehude - Prelude and fugue in F major
 Buxtehude - Prelude and fugue in F# minor
 Buxtehude - Prelude and fugue in G minor
 Buxtehude - Prelude in E minor
 Liszt - Dante Symphony
 Transcriptions of all 13 of Liszt's Symphonic Poems
 Liszt - Faust Symphony
 Liszt - Es muss ein Wunderbares sein
 Mozart - Symphony no.40
 Mozart - Canzone on The Marriage of Figaro
 Paganini - Bravoure Study on Caprices
 Purcell - Chaconne
 Reubke - Sonata on the 94th Psalm
 Stradal - Abenddämmerung
 Strauss J - Concert paraphrase on the waltz "Dorfschwalben aus Österreich"
 Wagner -  Winterstürme wichen dem Wonnemond (from Die Walküre); Der Ritt der Walküren (from Die Walküre); Schluss des letzten Aufzuges (from Die Walküre) Waldweben (from Siegfried); Rheinfahrt aus dem Vorspiel (from Götterdämmerung); Trauermusik aus dem letzten Aufzug (from Götterdämmerung); Wesendonck-Lieder. 
 Vivaldi / J.S. Bach - Organ Concerto in D minor

References
 Anton Bruckner (1824-1896) and Viennese Musicians of 19th century, accessed April 8, 2008.
 Anton Bruckner Symphony Versions Discography Compiled and Maintained by John F. Berky, accessed April 8, 2008.

External links
 
 

1860 births
1930 deaths
Czech classical composers
Czech male classical composers
Czech classical pianists
Male classical pianists
People from Teplice